Tony Kemp (born 18 January 1968) is a New Zealand former rugby league test representative and former coach of the New Zealand Warriors. He is a commentator for Māori Television's coverage of the Auckland Rugby League competition and also serves as the Football Manager for the New Zealand Rugby League.

Background
Kemp was born in Whangarei but raised in Waitara, and attended Waitara High School. He played rugby league for the Randwick Kingfishers in the Wellington Rugby League competition and in 1987 made the Junior Kiwis.

Playing career

1980s
In 1986/87 he joined the Doncaster for a season before taking up a professional career full-time when he joined the Newcastle Knights in 1988. During the 1988 Great Britain Lions tour Newcastle hosted a match against the visiting British national team with Kemp playing at centre and scoring a try in the Knights' 12 – 28 loss. Kemp first made the New Zealand national rugby league team in 1989. He later played for the Castleford Tigers (Heritage No. 707), South Queensland Crushers, Leeds Rhinos and Wakefield Trinity Wildcats (Heritage No. 1145) (captain). Kemp was selected to play for New Zealand at centre in all three Test matches of the 1989 Kangaroo tour of New Zealand.

1990s
During the 1990 Great Britain Lions tour Kemp was selected to play for New Zealand in all three Test matches against the visiting British national team. During the 1992 Great Britain Lions tour of Australasia Kemp was selected to play for the Kiwis at centre in both Test matches against the touring British national team, scoring a try in the first game victory. He was selected to play in all three games of the 1993 Trans-Tasman Test series. Kemp was selected to go on the 1993 New Zealand rugby league tour of Great Britain and France, playing in two Test matches. During the 1995 ARL season Kemp played for the South Queensland Crushers.

Kemp joined Leeds in 1995, appearing 47 times in four seasons at the club. Kemp was selected to play for New Zealand at the 1995 Rugby League World Cup. He retired having played twenty-five games for New Zealand. While at Leeds in 1998 he coached the Alliance team to a championship win. In 2000 Kemp, along with all of the other players aged over 24, had his contract with the Wakefield Trinity Wildcats terminated due to the club's financial crisis.

Coaching career

After two years of playing for Wakefield Trinity Wildcats Kemp retired to take over from Andy Kelly as head coach. He helped save the club from relegation before leaving to return home to New Zealand. In 2001 Kemp became the assistant coach behind Daniel Anderson at the New Zealand Warriors. He openly said that he wanted to be the next head coach after Anderson. Kemp got his wish, taking over from Anderson when he was sacked halfway through the 2004 NRL season. Kemp was in charge for a season and a half before being sacked himself. In 2008 he was named in the Taranaki Rugby League Team of the Century.

In 2010 Kemp was appointed team manager of the New Zealand national rugby league team. In 2012 he was named in the Wellington Rugby League's Team of the Century.

References

External links
Statistics at rugbyleagueproject.org
(archived by web.archive.org) Kiwis too strong for Kumuls
(archived by web.archive.org) Tony Kemp profile Leeds Rugby
1999 RUGBY LEAGUE: TEAM-BY-TEAM GUIDE TO SUPER LEAGUE
(archived by web.archive.org) Statistics at thecastlefordtigers.co.uk

1968 births
Living people
Castleford Tigers players
Doncaster R.L.F.C. players
Junior Kiwis players
Leeds Rhinos players
New Zealand national rugby league team players
New Zealand rugby league administrators
New Zealand rugby league coaches
New Zealand rugby league commentators
New Zealand rugby league players
Expatriate sportspeople in Australia
New Zealand expatriate sportspeople in England
New Zealand Warriors coaches
Newcastle Knights players
People educated at Waitara High School
Randwick Kingfishers players
Rugby league centres
South Queensland Crushers players
Taranaki rugby league team players
Waitara Bears players
Wakefield Trinity captains
Wakefield Trinity coaches
Wakefield Trinity players
Wellington rugby league team players